Valentina Kim (born 20 July 1995) is a Russian female acrobatic gymnast. With partner Elizaveta Dubrovina, Kim achieved silver in the 2014 Acrobatic Gymnastics World Championships.

References

External links

 

1995 births
Living people
Russian acrobatic gymnasts
Female acrobatic gymnasts
Medalists at the Acrobatic Gymnastics World Championships
21st-century Russian women